The Wembley Spring Cup was a greyhound racing competition held annually at Wembley Stadium. It was inaugurated in 1930, one of the earliest competitions. The race changed its name to the Blue Riband in 1981.

Following the end of the Wembley Greyhounds the Blue Riband was transferred to Greyhound Racing Association (GRA) sister track Hall Green in 1999.

Past winners

Venues & Distances 
1930-1980 (Wembley 525y/490m)

References

Greyhound racing competitions in the United Kingdom
1930 establishments in the United Kingdom
1980 disestablishments in the United Kingdom
Sport in the London Borough of Brent
Recurring sporting events established in 1930
Greyhound racing in London
Events at Wembley Stadium